Pimpalas is the name both of a town in the Nashik District of Maharashtra, India. The Marathi name signifies "a place without mountains", and indeed the taluka's topography is fairly level, with hardly any hills. Located northeast of Nashik city, the Taluka borders Sinnar, Nashik, Dindori, Chandwad, and Yeola Talukas and Ahmednagar District, and has no direct access to the sea.

Pimpalas Town

Although facilities in the surrounding villages are improving, the town remains the local transportation and communication hub as well as the seat of government and law enforcement, with additional district courts serving the Niphad, Yeola and Pimpalgaon Baswant courts. Pimpalas is also the center for medical and veterinary care, trade, Land Development Bank branches and many Co-operative Banks. It is also a center for education, with high schools, junior colleges, senior colleges, private ITI and other technical Institutes.

Religious sites
Pimpalas Town is home to a number of Hindu temples dedicated to various deities, as well as to a Dargah and a few mosques. The Prabhu Shri Ram's temple is located in pimpalas. As well as Ganesh and Hanuman temple are also located. A traditional fair in honour of Shree Khandoba (not to be confused with another Khandoba fair in Chandori in the Taluka) is held on Magha Shuddha Paurnima and attracts a large number of people from the surrounding areas.

Flora and fauna
Agrarian Pimpalas is one of the district's most fertile—and flood-prone—talukas.
Its major rivers are the Godavari and its tributary, the Kadawa; as of 1975 irrigation was achieved by means of the Vadali river dam, bandhara, near the taluka, in addition to "well over a hundred" wells. Sugarcane is one of the most important agricultural products and the basis for a sugar refining and alcohol distilling industry, conducted at two co-operative sugar factories, the Niphad Sahakari Sakhar Karkhana in Bhausahebnagar and the Karmaveer Kakasaheb Wagh Sahakari Sakhar Karkhana in Kakasahebnagar. Major wine producers in the Vinchur MIDC area are the Vinsura and Vinsula wineries. Other major crops include onions, grapes, soybean, tomatoes and flowers, all exported internationally, as well as wheat, gram, and other vegetables and grains (bajra, sorghum, tur). Pimpalas is the largest grape processing location in India.

Demographics
In the 2001 census, the Pimpalas total population was 10322

References

Cities and towns in Nashik district
Talukas in Maharashtra